Aricha Ghat is an important river port in Bangladesh. It is situated in Manikganj District.  The port is managed by Bangladesh Inland Water Transport Authority. Daulatdia-Paturia route ferries ply from this port.

Bangladesh Liberation War
Mukti Bahini sank one launch, three ferries, one coaster and launch and terminal pontoon in the Ghat during Bangladesh liberation war.

Fishing
Hilsha is caught from the area. Sudipta Das, former vice chairman of National Fishermen's Cooperative in Dhaka called the place "Prime Spot" for catching Hilsha.

References 

Manikganj District
Ports and harbours of Bangladesh